Susumu is a masculine Japanese given name. Notable people with the name include:

Susumu Akagi (born 1972) Japanese voice actor
Susumu Aoyagi (青柳 進, born 1968), Japanese baseball player
Susumu Chiba (born 1970), Japanese voice actor
, Japanese bobsledder
Susumu Fujita (1912–1991), Japanese actor
Susumu Fukui (born 1947), Japanese Go player
Susumu Hani (born 1928), Japanese film director
, Japanese ice hockey player
Susumu Hirasawa (born 1954), Japanese progressive-electronic artist
Susumu Ishii (1924–1991), Japanese criminal
, Japanese urologist
Susumu Kajiyama (born around 1950), Japanese criminal
Susumu Katsumata (disambiguation), multiple people
Susumu Kitagawa (born 1951), Japanese chemist
, Japanese sport shooter
Susumu Kuno (born 1933), Japanese linguist and author
Susumu Kurobe (born 1939), Japanese actor
Susumu Matsushima (born 1913), Japanese photographer
Susumu Matsushita (born 1950), Japanese manga artist.
Susumu Mochizuki (born 1978), Japanese professional wrestler
, Japanese politician
Susumu Noguchi (1908-1961), Japanese professional boxer
Susumu Ohno (1928–2000), Japanese American geneticist and evolutionary biologist
Susumu Ōno (born 1919), Japanese linguist
Susumu Ojima (born 1953), Japanese entrepreneur
, Japanese swimmer
Susumu Tachi (born 1946), Japanese academic
, Japanese middle-distance runner
, Japanese sprinter
Susumu Terajima (born 1963), Japanese actor
Tōki Susumu (born 1974), Japanese former sumo wrestler
Susumu Tonegawa (born 1939), Japanese scientist
, Japanese footballer and manager
Yamazaki Susumu (circa 1833-1868), Japanese spy
, Japanese Buddhist scholar
Susumu Yanase (born 1950), Japanese politician
Susumu Yokota (21st century), Japanese composer
, Japanese manga artist

Fictional characters
Susumu Gondawara, a minor character from Yakuza 2/Yakuza Kiwami 2
, main character from Mr. Driller
Susumu Kodai, main character from Space Battleship Yamato
Susumu Utada, a character from Machine Robo Rescue

See also
6925 Susumu, a main-belt asteroid

Japanese masculine given names